Muzi Dlamini (born 16 February 1993) is a Swazi footballer.

Dlamini, who plays club football with local side Royal Leopards F.C., was called up to Swaziland U-23 for the 2015 All African Games and 2015 CAF U-23 Championship.

References

External links 
 
 

Living people
1993 births
Eswatini international footballers
Association football midfielders
Swazi footballers
Green Mamba F.C. players
Royal Leopards F.C. players